The House Across the Lake is a 1954 British crime film directed by Ken Hughes and starring Alex Nicol, Hillary Brooke, Sid James and Susan Stephen. A film noir it was produced as a second feature by Hammer Films and shot at the company's Bray Studios. It was released in the United States by Lippert Pictures under the title Heat Wave.

Plot
An American pulp novelist, Mark Kendrick (Nicol), meets his rich neighbours across the lake and is soon seduced by beautiful blonde Carol (Brooke), the wife of Beverly Forrest (James), despite Beverly treating him as a friend. When Beverly is badly injured by a fall on his boat, Carol fails to persuade Mark to throw him overboard, so Carol does it.

After first refusing to go along with her plan to call it an accident, Mark agrees when Carol tells him that they will meet up again later and live off her dead husband's money. However, after the coroner rules the death an accident, Mark does not hear from her, but the still suspicious CID inspector on the case arranges for Mark to find out that Carol has secretly married another old flame and changed residences. Mark angrily confronts her, but she sneers that she only used him and that there is nothing he can do about it without implicating himself. Mark decides to confess, thinking that, although it will probably mean a prison sentence for him, it will mean the rope for Carol.

Cast
Alex Nicol as Mark Kendrick 
Hillary Brooke as Carol Forrest 
Sid James as Beverly Forrest 
Susan Stephen as Andrea Forrest
Paul Carpenter as Vincent Gordon 
Alan Wheatley as Inspector MacLennan
Peter Illing as Harry Stevens 
Gordon McLeod as Doctor Emery 
Joan Hickson as Mrs. Hardcastle 
John Sharp as Mr. Hardcastle 
Hugh Dempster as Frank
 Monti DeLyle as 	Head Waiter

Production
The film was based on a novel by Ken Hughes, High Wray, published in 1952. It was filmed at Bray Studios. Nicol and Brooke were the only Americans in the cast, although Brooke played a British character, as she did in most films. (Her mastery of a "posh" accent caused her to be typecast as British in Hollywood films starting in the 1940s.) Filming occurred at Bray Studios in Berkshire.

Reception
According to an obituary of Ken Hughes, "The film was praised by critics, and began Hughes's ascent into more important productions. "

Filmink said "It’s quite a fun movie, reminiscent of The Postman Always Rings Twice; one is inclined to wonder if Nicol’s character, a writer under the pump and distracted by lust, was a Hughes self-portrait."

References

Bibliography
 Chibnall, Steve & McFarlane, Brian. The British 'B' Film. Palgrave MacMillan, 2009.

External links

House Across the Lake at Letterbox DVD
House Across the Lake at BFI
The House Across the Lake at Reel Streets
Review of film at Cinema Retro

1954 films
1954 crime drama films
British crime drama films
British black-and-white films
Films directed by Ken Hughes
Films shot at Bray Studios
Adultery in films
Films based on novels
Film noir
Hammer Film Productions films
1950s English-language films
1950s British films